The Hangaroa River is a river in the Gisborne Region of New Zealand. Its source is the Huiarau Ranges in the Te Urewera National Park, and flows southeast to merge with the Ruakituri River near Te Reinga. The combined rivers form the Wairoa River, which flows south into Hawke Bay.

Fauna
Rainbow trout populate the upper reaches. The upper river has a rock and stone bed, and flows through native bush with pools and short stretches of rapids. The lower river flows through farmland and contains brown trout.

See also
List of rivers of New Zealand

References

Land Information New Zealand - Search for Place Names

Rivers of the Gisborne District
Rivers of New Zealand